"Pismo-Glava" is a song by Croatian pop singer Jelena Rozga from her third studio album Moderna žena (2016). "Pismo-Glava" was written by Croatian lyricist and songwriter Vjekoslava Huljić and arranged and produced by Tonči Huljić. "Pismo-Glava" premiered on Naxi Radio in Belgrade, Serbia on 2 December 2016. It was released as a single through Croatia Records on 8 December 2016. "Pismo-Glava" is an emotional slow-tempo ballad that expresses the love feelings of a female protagonist towards her doubtful male counterpart. Several music critics praised the song's sound, which they recognized as typical for the singer. "Pismo-Glava" was commercially successful in Croatia where it managed to debut and peak at number 5 on the HR Top 40 for the week ending 8 December 2016.

An accompanying music video for "Pismo-Glava" directed by Darko Drinovac premiered on the singer's official YouTube channel on 8 December 2016. The video, filmed in an autumn setting and in a mansion, shows Rozga lip-syncing to the camera, as she appears donned in several dresses, posing in front of movie cameras. The singer's fashion style, overall look and sex-appeal in the clip received praise from critics. As of 2022, the video has been watched more than 10 million times on YouTube. "Pismo-Glava" was performed live during a televised appearance at the 18. Večernjakov pečat held on 18 May 2018 in Mostar, Bosnia and Herzegovina and was later included in the set list of Rozga's live concerts and gigs.

Background
"Pismo-Glava" was first announced as the lead single of Jelena Rozga's third studio album Moderna Žena at the end of November 2016 on narodni radio. The song had its exclusive one-time airplay on 2 December on Naxi Radio in Belgrade, Serbia. On 8 December 2016, "Pismo-Glava" was released as a single, preceding the album's release by 8 days. As with all other songs on the album, "Pismo-Glava" was written by Croatian lyricist and songwriter Vjekoslava Huljić and arranged and produced by Tonči Huljić. The track was arranged by Dušan Vasić and Leo Škaro.

Musically, the song is an emotional ballad that discusses feelings of love of the female protagonist towards her male counterpart, who is doubtful and "wants her a little, then does not want her again". During the chorus, the female protagonist decides to throw a coin, letting head or tail decide while she keeps her eyes closed, despite knowing that regardless on which side the coin falls, she will still choose the love interest she was singing of earlier. During an interview preceding its release, Rozga described the song's conception and lyrics: "'Pismo-Glava' is a song that touched my soul. When I read only the lyrics of the song while the melody was still not ready, I cried and I knew... I have a song for myself and for all women". A writer for Croatian newspaper Jutarnji list and a writer of the Slovenian website si21.com both described the song as "wonderful". A writer of Telegraf.rs felt that "Pismo-Glava" was in the "recognizable pop sound of the singer, which according to the opinion of many is the direction which fits her best". A similar description was offered by a journalist from Story.hr, who in a review of the album Moderna Žena described it as a "classical pop ballad" along with "Cirkus".

On 21 March 2018, Rozga re-recorded a tambourine acoustic cover of "Pismo-Glava" and "Bižuterija" which were included on the album Prijatelji Tamburice. This version of the song was arranged by Ervin Malina.

Music video
On 2 December 2016, during the radio premiere of "Pismo-Glava", Rozga shared a promotional photograph on her official Instagram account taken from the accompanying music video showing her donned in a golden dress. On 8 December, the clip for the song, directed by Darko Drinovac, was released on the singer's official Facebook page and YouTube channel on 8 December 2016. John Pavlish served as the director of photography. Rozga's looks were finalized by Saša Joković who was in charge of the make-up, Antonija Nikolić in charge of her hairstyle and Mate Rončević in charge of her overall style. In one of the scenes, the singer is dressed in an elegant red night dress designed by Diana Viljevac. 

The music video opens with Rozga walking towards the camera, singing the lyrics of the song, surrounded by leafless trees in an autumn setting. For the opening scenes, she is dressed in a golden gown and has round white and yellow earrings. She soon walks in front of a red platform as cameras surround her. The video then shows her in the inside of a building, donned in a red gown and golden earrings as she sings the lyrics of the song. This is followed by a change of looks as the singer is seen in a white dress in the following scene and again in a light brown coat in the next. This is interspersed with scenes of the singer running in a hallway, posing for the camera and singing next to the trees. In the second half of the song, Rozga appears dressed in a pink dress as the video quickly shows all her looks. A photographer wearing glasses also appears next to Rozga and taking pictures of her in several scenes of the video. 

The singer's fashion style in the video was praised by a writer for Net.hr who felt that she shines in the music video. A writer for Telegraf.rs also praised her look as "more sex-appealing than ever". Similarly, a writer for the Macedonian newspaper Republika felt that she "never looked more attractive" in the video which was filled with "scenes that set Jelena's sex appeal in the foreground". Additionally, Pavlish's photography work was described as "superb" by Tena Brnad from Lika Club EU. In the first week of its release, the music video for the song had over 1 million views on YouTube. As of October 2022, the video has garnered over 10 million views on the platform.

Live performances
The singer performed "Pismo-Glava" during a televised appearance at the 18. Večernjakov pečat held in Mostar, Bosnia and Herzegovina on 18 May. The song was also included on the set list during many of the singer's concerts in the post-Yugoslav region. On 3 May 2022, she performed an acoustic version of the song, along with Milan Terze on guitar, during one of her live Instagram home concerts held in the midst of the COVID-19 pandemic.

Charts
In the week following its premiere on the radio, "Pismo-Glava" debuted at number 5 on the HR Top 40 chart in Croatia for the week ending 8 December 2016. In the following two weeks, the single fell to positiond number 13 and 15 on the chart. It was last seen on the chart on the chart for the week ending 16 February 2017 at number 39, having spent a total of 11 weeks in the top 40.

Credits and personnel
Information related to the credits and personnel of "Pismo-Glava" is taken from the single release on Discogs.
Jelena Rozga – vocals
Vjekoslava Huljić – songwriting
Tonči Huljić – music, arrangement
Dušan Vasić – arrangement
Leo Škaro – arrangement

References

External links
 

Croatian songs
Songs written by Vjekoslava Huljić
2016 songs
2016 singles
Song recordings produced by Tonči Huljić